Elections to the City Council were held in May 1995. The Conservative Party lost further ground, the Liberal Democrats remained the Opposition and Labour slightly increased their majority.

1995
20th century in Newcastle upon Tyne
1995 English local elections